Chippewaella patellitheca is a stem-gastropod mollusc from Furongian-aged strata of Late Cambrian Wisconsin.  According to Peter J. Wagner, it is the most basal gastropod.

Morphology
C. patellitheca is known from broad, low, cap-shaped or mound-shaped shells around 2 centimeters in diameter.  The shell has a slight apex that points posteriorly, and is at the posterior end of a central dorsal ridge.

References

External links
 ----- [no date]. Systematic Paleontology of the Earliest Gastropods (Including Family and Genus Level Stratigraphic Ranges and Synonyms

Cambrian gastropods
Gastropod genera
Cambrian animals of North America

Cambrian genus extinctions